Badiul Alam Majumdar (born February 1946) is a Bangladeshi economist, development worker, political analyst, local government and election expert. He is the vice president and country director of the US-based charity The Hunger Project. He is the founder-secretary of a civil society organization named Citizens for Good Governance (SHUJAN).

Early life
Majumdar was born in February 1946 at Polaiya village at Laksham Upazila in Comilla of the then British India (now Bangladesh). He completed his Higher Secondary School Certificate in 1962 from and graduated from Dhaka University in 1967. He earned his post graduate degree from the same university in 1968. He completed a graduate fellowship at Claremont Graduate University from 1970 to 1971. Later, he obtained his PhD degree in economics from Case Western Reserve University.

References

1946 births
Living people
People from Comilla District
Bangladeshi economists